The Critics' Circle Theatre Awards, originally called Drama Theatre Awards up to 1990, are British theatrical awards presented annually for the closing year's theatrical achievements. The winners, from theatre throughout the United Kingdom, are selected via vote by the professional theatre critics of The Critics' Circle.

Winners, 1982 to present

Best New Play
1980s

1990s

2000s

2010s

2020s

Best Actor
1980s

1990s

2000s

2010s

2020s

Best Actress
1980s

1990s

2000s

2010s

2020s

The Trewin Award for Best Shakespearean Performance
2000s

2010s

2020s

Best Director
1980s

1990s

2000s

2010s

2020s

The Peter Hepple Award for Best Musical
1980s

1990s

2000s

2010s

2020s

Most Promising Playwright
1980s

1990s

2000s

2010s

2020s

Best Designer
1980s

1990s

2000s

2010s

2020s

The Jack Tinker Award for Most Promising Newcomer (other than a playwright)
Award dedicated to Jack Tinker from 1996 onwards.

1980s

1990s

2000s

2010s

2020s

Special Awards for Services to the Theatre

See also
Laurence Olivier Awards
Evening Standard Theatre Awards
Ian Charleson Awards
The Offies (The Off West End Theatre Awards)
WhatsOnStageAwards
Critics' Awards for Theatre in Scotland
Theatre Book Prize
TMA Theatre Awards

References

External links
The Critics' Circle Official Website

Theatre in London